The 2014 California lieutenant gubernatorial election was held on November 4, 2014, to elect the lieutenant governor of California. Incumbent Democratic Lieutenant Governor Gavin Newsom ran for re-election to a second term in office.

A primary election was held on June 3, 2014. Under California's nonpartisan blanket primary law, all candidates appear on the same ballot, regardless of party. In the primary, voters may vote for any candidate, regardless of their party affiliation. The top two finishers — regardless of party — advance to the general election in November, even if a candidate manages to receive a majority of the votes cast in the primary election. Washington is the only other state with this system, a so-called "top two primary" (Louisiana has a similar "jungle primary"). Newsom and Republican Ron Nehring finished first and second, respectively, and contested the general election, which Newsom won.

Primary election

Candidates

Democratic Party

Declared
 Eric Korevaar, mechanical/aerospace engineer, candidate for governor in 2003 and candidate for Lieutenant Governor in 2010
 Gavin Newsom, incumbent Lieutenant Governor

Withdrew
 Michael Crosby
 Larry K. Reed

Republican Party

Declared
 Zachary Collins, business owner
 David Fennell, entrepreneur
 Ron Nehring, strategist, commentator and former Chairman of the California Republican Party
 George Yang, software developer

Withdrew
 Ernie Konnyu, former U.S. Representative

Green Party

Declared
 Jena F. Goodman, student

Peace and Freedom Party

Declared
 Amos Johnson, security guard

Americans Elect

Declared
 Alan Reynolds, businessman

Results

General election

Polling

Results

References

External links
California Lieutenant Governor election, 2014 at Ballotpedia
Campaign contributions at FollowTheMoney.org

Official campaign websites
Eric Korevaar for Lieutenant Governor
Ron Nehring for Lieutenant Governor
Gavin Newsom for Lieutenant Governor
Alan Reynolds for Lieutenant Governor

Lieutenant Governor
California
2014
Gavin Newsom